Ida Rebecca Guehai (born 15 July 1994), known as Rebecca Guehai, is an Ivorian professional footballer who plays as a midfielder or forward for Spanish club EDF Logroño and the Ivory Coast women's national team.

In mid-August 2018, Guehai was diagnosed with cardiovascular deficiencies, which prevent her from playing high-level football. At the time, she was about to sign with RCD Espanyol. However, she did not retire.

Club career
Guehai joined Kristianstads ahead of the 2015 season, aged 20. She scored three goals in her first two games and was hailed as the league's best acquisition in the Aftonbladet newspaper's mid-season review.

International career
In December 2011, Guehai was called-up in the Ivory Coast women's national football team. The following year she was part of the team selected for the 2012 African Women's Championship.

Guehai was included in the Ivory Coast women's team for the 2014 African Women's Championship that defeated South Africa, 
in a third place play-off finishing with Guehai's late goal, for a 1–0 win. The result qualified the underdog Ivory Coast for their debut FIFA Women's World Cup, at South Africa's expense.

See also
List of Ivory Coast women's international footballers

References

External links
 Profile at FIF 
 
 Player Swedish domestic football stats  at SvFF
 

1994 births
Living people
Women's association football forwards
Ivorian women's footballers
People from Gôh-Djiboua District
Ivory Coast women's international footballers
2015 FIFA Women's World Cup players
Damallsvenskan players
Kristianstads DFF players
Primera División (women) players
Levante UD Femenino players
EdF Logroño players
Ivorian expatriate footballers
Ivorian expatriate sportspeople in Sweden
Expatriate women's footballers in Sweden
Ivorian expatriate sportspeople in Spain
Expatriate women's footballers in Spain
Primera Federación (women) players
Segunda Federación (women) players